Outlaws of the Marsh is a Chinese television series adapted from Shi Nai'an's classical 14th century novel Water Margin. It was first broadcast on Shandong TV in China in 1983, and was not completed until 1986. The series was one of the earliest television dramas with an ancient China setting to be produced in mainland China. It was divided into different parts, each focusing on the story line of a certain character. Widely regarded as a classic in mainland China, the series won a Golden Eagle Award.

Cast

Liangshan heroes

 Peng Yintai as Chao Gai
 Bao Guo'an / Yang Yuqing as Song Jiang
 Ji Zhenhua as Wu Yong
 Zhang Xingya as Gongsun Sheng
 Ding Rujun as Lin Chong
 Li Chaoyou as Chai Jin
 Ding Xiaoqiu as Zhu Tong
 Yu Shoujin as Lu Zhishen
 Zhu Yanping as Wu Song
 Wang Haisheng as Yang Zhi
 Zhang Fumin as Liu Tang
 Dong Ziwu as Li Kui
 Zhou Bo as Shi Jin
 Zhang Dingrong as Lei Heng
 Ma Houxin as Ruan Xiaoer
 Liu Ning as Ruan Xiaowu
 Wang Bin as Ruan Xiaoqi
 Wang Xiuli as Hu Sanniang
 Liu Weicheng as Song Wan
 Hu Chaofeng as Du Qian
 Zhou Xiaosheng as Li Zhong
 Wang Junfa as Zhou Tong
 Han Yiqiang as Zhu Gui
 Sun Cuiping as Gu Dasao
 Qiu Jianhua as Sun Erniang
 Meng Xianli as Bai Sheng

Others

 Xu Xueli as Butcher Zheng
 Song Hong as Jin Cuilian
 Liang Zhao as Jin Cuilian's father
 Liu Ziyun as Innkeeper
 Chen Meicun as Granny Yu
 Yu Yan as Old woman
 Li Changqing as Prisoner
 Wang Yougang as Abbot
 Gao Ruping as Elder Zhizhen
 Li Liang as Boy
 Dai Tiansi as Squire Zhao
 Li Dexiang as Blacksmith
 Wei Wensheng as Squire Liu
 Feng Chong as Housekeeper
 Ma Yingchun as Zhang San
 Li Zhenduo as Li Si
 Mou Changling as Elder Zhiqing
 Wang Yuyao as Guest
 Yang Chunsheng as Caitou
 Xing Hong as Lin Chong's wife
 Chai Zhenduo as Instructor Zhang
 Li Xiangzhi as Jin'er
 Li Yanhua as Li Xiao'er
 Lei Zhongqian as Gao Qiu
 Huang Gang as Gao Yanei
 Wu Yongli as Lu Qian
 Sun Daming as Fu'an
 Zhao Yong as Dong Chao
 Ren Longhan as Xue Ba
 Tian Zhiming as Instructor Hong
 Wang Bing as Tavern owner
 Liu Yu as Li Xiao'er's wife
 Huang Mingduo as Prison camp official
 Yuan Chuancai as Warden
 Wang Bin as Wang Lun
 Jiao Tiyi as Liang Shijie
 Li Suyu as Liang Shijie's wife
 Gao Ruping as Supervisor Xie
 Mao Yucong as Housekeeper
 Li Zhenfeng as Fat Yuhou
 Shu Yaoxuan as Thin Yuhou
 Sun Chuanxin as He Tao
 Yu Yan as He Tao's wife
 Xin Ren as He Qing
 Wang Zhihai as Constable
 Xu Xiaoyi as Governor
 Tian Jiali as Magistrate
 Wei Huili as Yan Poxi
 Zhang Qian as Granny Wang
 Wang Lingyun as Jiang the Door God's concubine
 Kang Qunzhi as Inspector Zhang's wife
 Shang Lihua as Yulan
 Wang Yuxia as Inspector Zhang's daughter
 Bao Shaohua as Liu Gao's wife
 Xu Shaohua as Chen Xing
 Zhu Deying as Li Gui's wife
 Sun Zhimin as Li Kui's mother
 Che Xiangqing as Yue Daniangzi
 Wang Lü'e as Chai Jin's wife
 Wang Junying as Gongsun Sheng's mother
 Zhang Shuzhen as Squire Liu's wife
 Mou Xia as Pan Jinlian
 Wang Yuxia as Fairy of the Nine Heavens

 Han Yiqiang, Lu Honglin as soldiers
 Zhou Limin, Wu Hongzhang, Si Zhaode as waiters
 Yang Hongbao, Li Zhaoping, Shan Junyi, Zhang Xingyun, Wang Jiguang, Xu Yumu, Zhu Xiangxi, Yang Shenghe, Li Baoquan as monks
 Meng Xianmin, Zhou Yafei, Ma Baotong as Squire Liu's servants
 Li Yihui, Liu Peng as Zhou Tong's henchmen
 Du Jun, Zhang Yan, Zeng Xianchun, Huang Shoumin, Li Yong as rascals
 Liu Xiaoming, Gai Wenge, Li Jianmin, Wu Yongli, Li Xingguo, Xu Shaojie, Yuan Zongquan, Song Hongtao, Wang Shusen, Ye Yueji, Sun Guoxi as soldiers

See also
 The Water Margin (film)
 The Water Margin (1973 TV series)
 The Water Margin (1998 TV series)
 All Men Are Brothers (TV series)

References

External links

Works based on Water Margin
Television series set in the Northern Song
1983 Chinese television series debuts
1986 Chinese television series endings
1980s Chinese television series
Chinese wuxia television series
Mandarin-language television shows